Elizabeth Shoumatoff (Russian: Елизавета Николаевна Шуматова, Yelizaveta Nikolayevna Shumatova, née Avinova) (October 6, 1888 – November 30, 1980) was a Russian-American painter who was best known for painting the Unfinished Portrait of Franklin D. Roosevelt. Other paintings included portraits of Lyndon B. Johnson and Lady Bird Johnson.

Early life 
Shoumatoff was born in Kharkiv (now in Ukraine) on October 6, 1888, the youngest child of an aristocratic military family in what was then Imperial Russia. Her father, Nikolai Aleksandrovich Avinov (1844-1911) was a lieutenant-general in the Imperial Russian Army.

Her eldest sibling Nikolai, a professor of fiscal law, was executed  in 1937 during the Great Purge. Her next oldest brother Andrey Avinoff was a prominent entomologist and artist. Elizabeth Shoumatoff went to the United States with her husband Leo Shoumatoff (a member of the Russian Purchasing Commission) in 1917 and after the October Revolution decided to stay there. They eventually made their home on Long Island. Leo Shoumatoff died in 1928 (drowned).

Career 
Shoumatoff's extraordinary talent for portraiture brought commissions from some of the most illustrious families in America, Great Britain and Europe. Her clients included members of the Frick, du Pont, Mellon, Boman, Woodruff and Firestone families, plus the Grand Ducal Family of Luxembourg. President Franklin D. Roosevelt was sitting for her at Warm Springs, Georgia, when he suffered a fatal cerebral hemorrhage on April 12, 1945.  When she was working, he said "I have a terrific headache."

Shoumatoff's portrait of Lyndon B. Johnson is on display at the White House. Johnson, who had famously rejected Peter Hurd's prior attempt by calling it "the ugliest thing I ever saw", approved Shoumatoff's painting as his official presidential portrait. Hurd's painting is exhibited at the Smithsonian Institution's National Portrait Gallery.

Death and legacy 
A longtime resident of Locust Valley, New York, Shoumatoff died in November 1980 aged 92. Her estate donated some of the sketches related to the Unfinished Portrait to the Franklin D. Roosevelt Presidential Library and Museum in Hyde Park, New York. Some of her other works and materials from the latter part of her life are now in the Archives of American Art.

Gallery

References 

1888 births
1980 deaths
20th-century American painters
20th-century American women artists
American people of Russian descent
American portrait painters
American women painters
Emigrants from the Russian Empire to the United States